Fairytale is a 2022 experimental animated fantasy film directed by Alexander Sokurov. It depicts conversations in purgatory among Adolf Hitler, Benito Mussolini, Joseph Stalin, and Winston Churchill, using archival footage, and also features Jesus and Napoleon.

Voice cast
 Lothar Deeg and Tim Ettelt as Hitler
 Vakhtang Kuchava as Stalin
 Fabio Mastrangelo as Mussolini
 Alexander Sagabashi and Michael Gibson as Churchill

Release
The film had its world premiere in August 2022 at the 75th Locarno Film Festival. It was submitted to the 2022 Cannes Film Festival but was not selected.

Reception
Neil Young of Screen Daily wrote, "while Fairytale stretches the viewer's indulgent patience even at a relatively brief 78 minutes, surrendering to its odd, oneiric flow can often prove an experience more pleasurable than purgatorial." Guy Lodge of Variety wrote that "even at just under 80 minutes, Fairytale too often appears to be running (or rather drifting) in place" but that "[a]s visions of purgatory go, it's an eerily beautiful one".

David Jenkins of Little White Lies wrote, "the novelty of the interactions and the almost lyrical directionlessness of the conversations manages to hold the attention, largely through the freshness and innovation of the visuals." Nicholas Bell of IONCINEMA called the film "a subversive reflection on the past as well as a hypnotic provocation", giving it three and a half out of five stars. Leonardo Goi of The Film Stage wrote, "lysergic and creatively fertile as its setup may sound, Fairytale is a rather staid dream", giving it a C+ grade.

References

External links
 
 

2022 animated films
Russian animated fantasy films
Belgian animated fantasy films
Adult animated films
Films with live action and animation
2020s avant-garde and experimental films
Russian avant-garde and experimental films
Belgian avant-garde and experimental films
Films about dictators
Films about Adolf Hitler
Films about Benito Mussolini
Films about Joseph Stalin
Films about Winston Churchill
Portrayals of Jesus in film
Depictions of Napoleon on film
Russian World War II films
Fiction about purgatory
2020s Georgian-language films
2020s German-language films
2020s Italian-language films
2020s English-language films
2022 multilingual films
Russian multilingual films
Belgian multilingual films
English-language Belgian films